Elbasan "Elba" Rashani (born 9 May 1993) is a professional footballer who plays as a striker for Ligue 1 club Clermont. Born in Sweden, he plays for the Kosovo national team.

Club career

Brøndby
On 24 July 2014, Rashani signed a four-year contract with Danish Superliga club Brøndby and received squad number 14. Brøndby reportedly paid a 4,9 million Danish krone transfer fee. Seven days later, he made his debut with Brøndby in the 2014–15 UEFA Europa League third qualifying round against Club Brugge after coming on as a substitute at 76th minute in place of Mikkel Thygesen.

Rosenborg

2016 season as loan
On 11 January 2016, Rashani joined Tippeligaen side Rosenborg, on a season-long loan. Two days later, he made his debut in a 1–0 away defeat against Odd after being named in the starting line-up.

2017 season
On 18 November 2016, Rashani returned and signed a two-year contract with Eliteserien club Rosenborg and this transfer would become legally effective in January 2017. On 23 March 2017, he made his debut with Odd in the 2017 Mesterfinalen against Brann after being named in the starting line-up.

Return to Odd
On 4 August 2017, Rashani signed a three-and-a-half year contract with Eliteserien club Odd and received squad number 11. Two days later, he made his debut in a 2–1 home win against Sogndal after being named in the starting line-up.

BB Erzurumspor
On 24 January 2021, Rashani signed a one-and-a-half year contract with Süper Lig club BB Erzurumspor. Three days later, he made his debut in a 2–0 away defeat against Galatasaray after coming on as a substitute at 46th minute in place of Rahman Buğra Çağıran.

Clermont
On 16 July 2021, Rashani signed a two-year contract with Ligue 1 club Clermont. On 8 August 2021, he made his debut against Bordeaux after coming on as a substitute at 78th minute in place of Jim Allevinah and assists in his side's first goal during a 0–2 away win. Fourteen days after his debut, Rashani scored his first goals for Clermont in his third appearance for the club in the 3–3 away draw against Lyon in Ligue 1. On 4 July 2022, Rashani signed a contract extension with Clermont until 2025.

International career
From 2010-2015, Rashani had been part of Norway at its youth international level, respectively has been part of the U17, U18, U19, Norway U20 and U21 teams and he with these teams played 33 matches and scored three goals. On 10 November 2015, he received a call-up from Kosovo for a friendly match against Albania, Rashani made his debut after coming on as a substitute at 67th minute in place of Mërgim Brahimi and scored his side's second goal during a 2–2 home draw.

Personal life
Rashani was born in Värnamo, Sweden from Kosovan parents from Vushtrri but grew up in Kragerø and Bø in Norway.

Career statistics

Club

International

Scores and results list Kosovo's goal tally first, score column indicates score after each Rashani goal.

|+ List of international goals scored by Elbasan Rashani
|-
|align="center"|1
|13 November 2015
|Pristina City Stadium, Pristina, Kosovo
|
|align="center"|2–1
|align="center"|2–2
|Friendly
|align="center"|
|-
|align="center"|2
|3 June 2016
|Stadion am Bornheimer Hang, Frankfurt, Germany
|
|align="center"|2–0
|align="center"|2–0
|Friendly
|align="center"|
|-
|align="center"|3
|13 November 2017
|Adem Jashari Olympic Stadium, Mitrovica, Kosovo
|
|align="center"|3–3
|align="center"|4–3
|Friendly
|align="center"|
|-
|align="center"|4
|10 June 2019
|Vasil Levski National Stadium, Sofia, Bulgaria
|
|align="center"|3–2
|align="center"|3–2
|UEFA Euro 2020 qualifying
|align="center"|
|}

Honours
Rosenborg
Eliteserien: 2016, 2017
Norwegian Cup: 2016
Mesterfinalen: 2017

References

External links
 
 
 

1993 births
Living people
People from Vushtrri
People from Kragerø
Kosovan footballers
Kosovo international footballers
Kosovan expatriate footballers
Kosovan expatriate sportspeople in Denmark
Kosovan expatriate sportspeople in Turkey
Kosovan expatriate sportspeople in France
Norwegian footballers
Norway youth international footballers
Norway under-21 international footballers
Norwegian expatriate footballers
Norwegian expatriate sportspeople in Denmark
Norwegian expatriate sportspeople in Turkey
Norwegian expatriate sportspeople in France
Association football wingers
Eliteserien players
Odds BK players
Rosenborg BK players
Danish Superliga players
Brøndby IF players
Süper Lig players
Büyükşehir Belediye Erzurumspor footballers
Ligue 1 players
Clermont Foot players
Sportspeople from Vestfold og Telemark